Your Face is a 1987 animated short film by Bill Plympton. It involves a man seated in a chair crooning about the face of his lover, and as he sings, his own face starts to distort in various ways. His song ends abruptly when a mouth opens in the floor and swallows him and the chair whole; after the closing credits, the mouth reappears and licks its lips.

Music
The vocals are by Maureen McElheron, known for composing the songs in The Tune, also by Bill Plympton. After the song was recorded, it was slowed by one-third, giving the desired and unusual effect, also making the voice more masculine. His face is distorted into many different shapes, such as a balloon, a cube and an ice cream cone.

Lyrics
The song is all original, made specifically for this short film, and the lyrics depict a metaphorical description of someone's face by using musical vocabulary to describe the beauty of their features.

Legacy
The short received a nomination for Academy Award for Best Animated Short Film at the 60th Academy Awards.

A variation of this short was used as the couch gag on The Simpsonss 29th season episode "3 Scenes Plus a Tag from a Marriage", with Homer Simpson's face replacing the original man, and Dan Castellaneta singing the vocals. This version ends with the Simpson family sitting on their living room couch.

Your Face was preserved by the Academy Film Archive in 2015.

References

External links

Your Face at TCM
Animation Show of Shows Excerpt on Vimeo

1980s American animated films
1980s animated short films
1987 animated films
American animated short films
Films directed by Bill Plympton
1987 films
Surrealist films
1980s English-language films
Films about shapeshifting